1,3-Propanedithiol is the chemical compound with the formula HSCH2CH2CH2SH.  This dithiol is a useful reagent in organic synthesis.  This liquid, which is readily available commercially, has an intense stench.

Use in organic synthesis
1,3-Propanedithiol is mainly used for the protection of aldehydes and ketones via their reversible formation of dithianes. A prototypical reaction is its  formation of 1,3-dithiane from formaldehyde. The reactivity of this dithiane illustrates the concept of umpolung.  Alkylation gives thioethers, e.g. 1,5-dithiacyclooctane.

The unpleasant odour of 1,3-propanedithiol has encouraged the development of alternative reagents that generate similar derivatives.

1,3-Propanedithiol is used in the synthesis of tiapamil.

Use in inorganic synthesis
1,3-Propanedithiol reacts with metal ions to form chelate rings.  Illustrative is the synthesis of the derivative diiron propanedithiolate hexacarbonyl upon reaction with triiron dodecacarbonyl:
Fe3(CO)12 +  C3H6(SH)2  →   Fe2(S2C3H6)(CO)6  +  H2  +  Fe(CO)5  +  CO

Safety
The stench of 1,3-propanedithiol can be neutralized with bleach.

See also
1,2-Propanedithiol

References

Reagents for organic chemistry
Thiols
Foul-smelling chemicals